Burduny is a rural locality (an ulus) in Kyakhtinsky District, Republic of Buryatia, Russia. The population was 128 as of 2010. There is 1 street.

Geography 
Burduny is located 22 km northeast of Kyakhta (the district's administrative centre) by road. Ust-Kiran is the nearest rural locality.

References 

Rural localities in Kyakhtinsky District